The 1966 Allan Cup was the Canadian senior ice hockey championship for the 1965–66 senior "A" season.  The event was hosted by the Drumheller Miners and Calgary, Alberta.  The 1966 playoff marked the 58th time that the Allan Cup has been awarded.

Teams
Sherbrooke Beavers (Eastern Canadian Champions)
Drumheller Miners (Western Canadian Champions)

Playdowns

Allan Cup Best-of-Seven Series
Drumheller Miners 6 - Sherbrooke Beavers 3
Sherbrooke Beavers 4 - Drumheller Miners 1
Sherbrooke Beavers 2 - Drumheller Miners 1
Drumheller Miners 5 - Sherbrooke Beavers 0
Drumheller Miners 3 - Sherbrooke Beavers 2
Drumheller Miners 5 - Sherbrooke Beavers 0

Eastern Playdowns
Quarter-final
Collingwood Shipbuilders defeated Sudbury-Levack Steelworkers 3-games-to-1
Collingwood Shipbuilders 8 - Sudbury-Levack Steelworkers 5
Sudbury-Levack Steelworkers 5 - Collingwood Shipbuilders 3
Collingwood Shipbuilders 8 - Sudbury-Levack Steelworkers 1
Collingwood Shipbuilders 11 - Sudbury-Levack Steelworkers 1
Morrisburg Combines defeated Monkton Hawks 3-games-to-1
Monkton Hawks 10 - Morrisburg Combines 3
Morrisburg Combines 5 - Monkton Hawks 3
Morrisburg Combines 5 - Monkton Hawks 4
Morrisburg Combines 3 - Monkton Hawks 1
Central Semi-final
Guelph Regals defeated Collingwood Shipbuilders 4-games-to-none
Guelph Regals 3 - Collingwood Shipbuilders 0
Guelph Regals 7 - Collingwood Shipbuilders 6
Guelph Regals 8 - Collingwood Shipbuilders 3
Guelph Regals 4 - Collingwood Shipbuilders 1
East Semi-final
Sherbrooke Beavers defeated Morrisburg Combines 4-games-to-3
Morrisburg Combines 3 - Sherbrooke Beavers 2
Sherbrooke Beavers 5 - Morrisburg Combines 2
Morrisburg Combines 2 - Sherbrooke Beavers 1
Morrisburg Combines 6 - Sherbrooke Beavers 5
Sherbrooke Beavers 11 - Morrisburg Combines 5
Sherbrooke Beavers 6 - Morrisburg Combines 2
Sherbrooke Beavers 9 - Morrisburg Combines 1
Final
Sherbrooke Beavers defeated Guelph Regals 4-games-to-2
Sherbrooke Beavers 7 - Guelph Regals 2
Guelph Regals 4 - Sherbrooke Beavers 3
Guelph Regals 5 - Sherbrooke Beavers 3
Sherbrooke Beavers 4 - Guelph Regals 3
Sherbrooke Beavers 4 - Guelph Regals 3
Sherbrooke Beavers 4 - Guelph Regals 2

Western Playdowns
Quarter-final
Drumheller Miners defeated Calgary Spurs 3-games-to-none
Drumheller Miners 2 - Calgary Spurs 1
Drumheller Miners 7 - Calgary Spurs 3
Drumheller Miners 6 - Calgary Spurs 0 
Pacific Semi-final
Drumheller Miners defeated Kimberley Dynamiters 3-games-to-none
Drumheller Miners 4 - Kimberley Dynamiters 3
Drumheller Miners 6 - Kimberley Dynamiters 4
Drumheller Miners 3 - Kimberley Dynamiters 2
West Semi-final
Selkirk Fishermen defeated Fort William Beavers 3-games-to-1
Selkirk Fishermen 9 - Fort William Beavers 6
Selkirk Fishermen 5 - Fort William Beavers 4
Fort William Beavers 5 - Selkirk Fishermen 2
Selkirk Fishermen 7 - Fort William Beavers 1
Final
Drumheller Miners defeated Selkirk Fishermen 3-games-to-1
Drumheller Miners 9 - Selkirk Fishermen 2
Selkirk Fishermen 6 - Drumheller Miners 3
Drumheller Miners ? - Selkirk Fishermen ?
Drumheller Miners 4 - Selkirk Fishermen 2

External links
Allan Cup archives 
Allan Cup website

Allan Cup
Allan